Gerald Alexander Tinker (born January 19, 1951) is a former track athlete and American football player, winner of gold medal in the 4 x 100 metres relay at the 1972 Summer Olympics.

Early years
Gerald Tinker attended Coral Gables Senior High School in Coral Gables, Florida, where he excelled as a football and track athlete. In 1967, Tinker, along with quarterback Craig Curry and Bertram Taylor, was part of an all-black backfield at the previously all-white school. The team was rated the team of the century by the FHSAA.

Olympics
At the 1972 Summer Olympics, Gerald Tinker ran the third leg in the American 4 x 100 metres relay team, which won a gold medal and equalled the United States' own world record of 38.19.  His cousin, Larry Black, also ran a leg in that same relay. Larry Black attended Miami Killian High School where he also was a track star. His school was a football rival of Coral Gables Senior High School that Gerald attended. Despite that, both teamed up to help win Olympic Gold.

NFL career

After the Olympics, Tinker was drafted by the Atlanta Falcons in the 2nd round (44th overall) of the 1974 NFL Draft as wide receiver. He played for the Falcons (1974–1975) and the Green Bay Packers (1975).

References

 

1951 births
Living people
Sportspeople from Coral Gables, Florida
Players of American football from Miami
Track and field athletes from Miami
American male sprinters
Athletes (track and field) at the 1972 Summer Olympics
Olympic gold medalists for the United States in track and field
American football return specialists
American football wide receivers
Atlanta Falcons players
Green Bay Packers players
Kent State Golden Flashes football players
Memphis Tigers football players
Medalists at the 1972 Summer Olympics
Track and field athletes in the National Football League